Hamidiyeh (also Romanized as Ḩamīdīyeh) is a village in Rayen Rural District, Rayen District, Kerman County, Kerman Province, Iran. At the 2006 census, its population was 21, in 4 families.

Hamid

Populated places in Kerman County